The 2021–22 season was the 118th season in the existence of SpVgg Greuther Fürth and the club's first season back in the top flight of German football. In addition to the domestic league, Greuther Fürth participated in this season's edition of the DFB-Pokal.

Players

First-team squad

Out on loan

Transfers

In

Out

Pre-season and friendlies

Competitions

Overall record

Bundesliga

League table

Results summary

Results by round

Matches
The league fixtures were announced on 25 June 2021.

DFB-Pokal

Statistics

Appearances and goals

|-
! colspan=16 style=background:#dcdcdc; text-align:center| Goalkeepers

|-
! colspan=16 style=background:#dcdcdc; text-align:center| Defenders

|-
! colspan=16 style=background:#dcdcdc; text-align:center| Midfielders

 

|-
! colspan=16 style=background:#dcdcdc; text-align:center| Forwards

|-
! colspan=16 style=background:#dcdcdc; text-align:center| Players transferred out during the season

Goalscorers

Last updated: 14 May 2022

References

SpVgg Greuther Fürth seasons
SpVgg Greuther Fürth